Martin Raymond Dudley  (born 31 May 1953) is an English author and politician. A former Anglican priest, he served as a City of London common councilman and authored various books about the Christian Church.

Until 31 December 2016, he was incumbent of the combined benefices of St Bartholomew in the City of London, known as the Parish of Great St Bartholomew, having been rector of St Bartholomew the Great since 1995 and priest in charge of St Bartholomew the Less since 2012.

Early life and education

Dudley was born in Birmingham where he attended King Edward’s School. After a year training at the Royal Military Academy Sandhurst, he returned to the Midlands to work for a travel company.

In 1974, Dudley studied theology at King's College London, graduating with Bachelor of Divinity and Master of Theology degrees. He studied for the priesthood at St Michael's College, Llandaff.

Dudley received a PhD from the University of London (King's College, London) in 1994 and pursued further studies in voluntary sector management at the Cass Business School, being awarded a MSc (City University) in 2006.

Ordained ministry
Dudley was ordained as a deacon in 1979 and a priest in 1980 at Llandaff Cathedral. After a curacy in Whitchurch, Cardiff, he became vicar of Weston, Hertfordshire in 1983 before being appointed vicar of Owlsmoor, Berkshire (1988–95), where he oversaw the building of a new parish church. On 9 September 1995, he became Rector of St Bartholomew the Great in the Diocese of London. 

In 2012, he also became priest in charge of St Bartholomew the Less. On 1 June 2015, the two parishes were dissolved and replaced with a united benefice, the Parish of Great St Bartholomew. The parish boundary incorporated precisely the two former parishes. Dudley continued as Rector of the new parish.

On 31 December 2016, Dudley retired from full-time ministry and stepped down as rector of Great St Bartholomew, with plans to become an "active priest who is also an independent scholar and writer".

Throughout the period of his ministry, he tended very much to the Anglo-Catholic wing of the Church of England.

Civil partnership blessing controversy
Dudley made news in 2008 when he blessed the civil partnership of two Anglican priests, for which he received a public rebuke from Richard Chartres, Bishop of London. In Riazat Butt’s Guardian profile, the late Colin Slee, Dean of Southwark, said that "he [Dudley] is very bright. He is a very consistent person in that he knows his own mind and doesn't mind if everyone else disagrees with him. He is very intelligent and prepared to take a stand for something he believes in, even if it's not going with the mainstream." Dudley justified his actions in an article in the New Statesman magazine.

Orthodoxy
In March 2018, Dudley was received into the Russian Orthodox Church as a layman.

Other work
Dudley was elected to the City Court of Common Council representing Aldersgate Ward in January 2002. He served on various City of London Corporation committees as well as being a governor of the Museum of London and a member of the Trust for London (formerly the City Parochial Foundation). He did not stand for re-election in the 2017 elections. In 1996, Dudley was admitted to the Freedom of the City of London and is a liveryman of the Worshipful Company of Farriers.

Personal life
Dudley married Paula Jones, a chiropodist, in 1976; they have two sons.

Honours
On 23 October 1997, Dudley was elected a Fellow of the Society of Antiquaries of London (FSA). He is also a Fellow of the Royal Historical Society (FRHistS). He is a liveryman of the Worshipful Company of Farriers, an honorary liveryman of the Worshipful Company of Hackney Carriage Drivers and an honorary freeman of the Worshipful Company of Farmers. 

He is a past master of the Guild of Public Relations Practitioners. He received an honorary Doctor of Arts degree from City University in 2014.

Publications
 (qv: Geoffrey Rowell, formerly Bishop of Europe)

References

External links
 St Bartholomew-the-Great website
 City of London Corporation committees
 Museum of London governors
 Trust for London committee member

1953 births
Living people
People from Birmingham, West Midlands
Alumni of King's College London
Alumni of Bayes Business School
Graduates of the Royal Military Academy Sandhurst
Alumni of St Michael's College, Llandaff
20th-century English Anglican priests
21st-century English Anglican priests
English book editors
English religious writers
Councilmen and Aldermen of the City of London
Serving Brothers of the Order of St John
Fellows of the Royal Historical Society
Associates of King's College London
Fellows of the Society of Antiquaries of London
Converts to Eastern Orthodoxy from Anglicanism
English Eastern Orthodox Christians
Members of the Russian Orthodox Church